is a 2020 Japanese animated romantic comedy drama film, based on the short story of the same name by Seiko Tanabe. The film stars the voices of Taishi Nakagawa and Kaya Kiyohara.

It is directed by Kotaro Tamura from a screenplay by Sayaka Kuwamura, with original character designs by Nao Emoto (who also created a tie-in manga), animation character designs by Haruko Iizuka (who also served as chief supervising animator), and animation production by Bones.

The film opened in 9th place at the Japanese box office in its initial week of release, and received highly positive reviews from critics.

Plot
Tsuneo Suzukawa is a 22-year-old university student studying marine biology. He works part-time at a diving shop, where he bonds with coworkers Mai and Hayato. On his way home after a lecture, he saves a paraplegic young woman named Kumiko Yamamura, who insists on being called "Josee". After being invited over for dinner as a token of gratitude, Tsuneo receives a job offer from Josee's grandmother, Chizu, to become a caretaker for Josee.

At first, Josee is hostile toward Tsuneo, calling him an intruder. She ordered him to do unreasonable things such as kneeling for a long time. Deflated by the job, Tsuneo decides to quit the caretaker job. Nevertheless, just before he makes the resignation, he finds that Josee has gone missing. When Tsuneo finally finds Josee, he figures out that she wants to see the sea. Therefore, he takes her to the sea, and they had a wonderful time together.

After this incident, Josee and Tsuneo travel to many places together. On a trip to a library, Josee tries to read books to children, which bored them. However, her drawing is appealing to them. She then slowly comes to the realization that she wants to become an illustrator.

Unfortunately, Josee's grandmother dies not long after this. Being left with little money to live on, Josee gives up on her dream and becomes an office worker. Meanwhile, Tsuneo received a scholarship from a university in Mexico, and will leave in a few months. Notwithstanding his bright future, he is still very worried of Josee's situation. Worried about Tsuneo, Mai, who is Tsuneo's co-worker in a diving shop, tells Josee to set Tsuneo free. 

Josee then calls Tsuneo to visit the sea together to farewell. Nonetheless, Josee is trapped in the middle of a road. To save her, Tsuneo rushes to her, ending up being hit by a car. 

Tsuneo is then found to suffer from a bone fracture in his feet and is told he may not walk again like he did before, let alone go diving. Devastated by the news, Tsuneo gives up on his rehabilitation and his dream of seeing clarion angelfish in Mexico. Mai then finds Josee, telling her about Tsuneo's situation and ask her to prove her feelings of Tsuneo. 

Josee then creates an illustration book indirectly featuring Tsuneo's and her story, with the main character representing Tsuneo successfully achieving his dream. She then asks Hayato, another co-worker in the diving shop, to bring Tsuneo to the library where Josee read the book to the children. Touched by the story, Tsuneo regained his spirit and dream, and actively rehabilitate.

On the day Tsuneo is discharged from the hospital, Josee has gone missing. Worried, Tsuneo visits many places and eventually starts running despite his injury. After a long search, he finds Josee at the zoo facing the tiger and the road which intimidates her before, by herself and succeeds. As they meet, Tsuneo and Josee confesses their love to each other, and kiss.

Tsuneo heads to Mexico to study. During Tsuneo's spring break, Josee meets Tsuneo again under a fully bloomed cherry blossom tree.

Cast

Production
The anime adaptation of the short story was announced on December 3, 2019, when Kadokawa Corporation approached the director Kotaro Tamura and laid out a set of books to choose from. They wanted to adapt a piece of classic Japanese literature; Josee was chosen in this meeting and the movie entered production. Tamura decided that he wanted the film to have a happy ending, in contrast to other darker films that focused on disability. He stated that "We wanted to have a very uplifting and positive message" The director noted that Josee's condition was inherited from birth, and that she didn't get it during her life. Rather than having the character develop from outside sources, they would instead have her change internally, like a normal character.

Production of this anime film officially started on December 3, 2019 and the website, poster and main staffs were released. On January 3, 2020, they announced that this film would be shown the summer of that year. On March 3, 2020, movie scenes and Josee and Tsuneo's character illustrations got released. However, due to the COVID-19 pandemic, the film's show date was delayed. On August 13, 2020, it was officially announced that the new release date is December 25, 2020.

Music
Evan Call composed the film's music. He also composed the opening theme Take Me Far Away which was performed by Ai Ichikawa. Eve performed the film's insert song Shinkai and ending theme Ao no Waltz.

Release
The film premiered at the 25th Busan International Film Festival on October 30, 2020, as the festival's closing film. It was later released theatrically in Japan on December 25, 2020, after being delayed from a mid-2020 release due to the COVID-19 pandemic.

Funimation acquired the film for release in North American theaters in July 2021 (Canada and the United States), with both the original Japanese and an English dub for the 2021 Toronto International Film Festival premiere. Anime Limited has acquired the film for release in the British Isles (the United Kingdom and Ireland), while Madman Entertainment has acquired the film for Oceania, and screened it in Australia and New Zealand on May 13, 2021, and June 10, 2021. The film screened in competition at the Annecy International Animation Film Festival taking place from June 14 to 19, 2021.

Reception

Accolades

References

External links
  
 
 

2020 anime films
2020 romantic comedy-drama films
2020s teen comedy-drama films
2020s teen romance films
Anime films based on novels
Animated comedy films
Animated drama films
Animated romance films
Animated films about friendship
Animated films based on children's books
Anime postponed due to the COVID-19 pandemic
Bones (studio)
Comedy-drama anime and manga
Films about artists
Films about paraplegics or quadriplegics
Films about road accidents and incidents
Films based on short fiction
Films postponed due to the COVID-19 pandemic
Films set in the 2010s
Films set in 2014
Films set in 2017
Films set in Chicago
Films set in Houston
Films set in Kobe
Films set in Mexico City
Films set in Osaka
Films set in Toronto
Films set in Yokohama
Funimation
Japanese romantic comedy-drama films
Japanese teen drama films
2020s Japanese-language films
Kadokawa Daiei Studio films
Romantic comedy anime and manga
Shochiku films